Woody Woodpecker Racing is a 2000 video game published by Konami and developed by Syrox Developments, based on the animated series The New Woody Woodpecker Show (and the animated short film series created by Walter Lantz). A Dreamcast version was originally scheduled to release on April 3, 2001.

Summary 
Similarly to other mascot kart-racing games, such as Mario Kart 64 and Crash Team Racing, the game involves Woody and eight other characters racing on sixteen race-tracks inspired by real world locations, like Las Vegas and Japan. The game features four modes: a single-player Quest mode, score-based World Championship mode, time-trial mode, and single-race mode. Players can chose from four vehicles, including: jalopies, all-terrain vehicles, stock cars, and racers

Reception

Woody Woodpecker Racing received "generally unfavorable" reviews according to aggregator Metacritic. Giancarlo Varanini of GameSpot gave the game a 3.6 of 10.

References

2000 video games
Cancelled Dreamcast games
Game Boy Color games
Kart racing video games
Konami games
PlayStation (console) games
Racing video games
Universal Interactive games
Video games based on Woody Woodpecker
Video games developed in the United Kingdom
Video games scored by Matt Furniss
Windows games
Woody Woodpecker
Multiplayer and single-player video games